The King Cobras are a prominent gang in New Zealand.

History
The King Cobras were founded by Samoans in Ponsonby sometime in the 1950s, making them the oldest gang in New Zealand. Initially, it was restricted to Samoans, but has since accepted other Polynesians. The King Cobras have had a presence across South, Central, North and West Auckland, Hutt Valley, Wellington and Christchurch.

The Cobras have proven to be very violent and have a history of possessing firearms. They have been involved in major cases of drug dealing, including in methamphetamine, cocaine, and marijuana. In 2003, members of the King Cobras ran a large methamphetamine ring along with the Head Hunters in one of Aucklands biggest drug cases. The King Cobras have been involved in several murder cases, including that of a 15-year-old boy, and the shooting of a rival gang member, as part of a membership process.

See also

 Gangs in New Zealand
 Black Power (New Zealand gang)
 Mongrel Mob
 Killa Beez (gang)

References

External links

Gangs in New Zealand
Māori culture in Auckland
Māori gangs
Polynesian gangs
Polynesian-New Zealand culture in Auckland
Samoan-New Zealand culture